Notothixos is a genus of mistletoe plant in the family Santalaceae.

Species
The Catalogue of Life lists:
 Notothixos cornifolius
 Notothixos floccosus
 Notothixos incanus
 Notothixos leiophyllus
 Notothixos malayanus
 Notothixos papuanus
 Notothixos subaureus
 Notothixos sulphureus

References

External links 

Santalaceae
Flora of Sri Lanka
Flora of Indo-China
Flora of Malesia
Flora of Australia
Santalales genera
Taxa named by Daniel Oliver